The 1995–96 Vancouver Canucks season was the Canucks' 26th season in the National Hockey League (NHL). It marked the year they played their first season in General Motors Place, the year future star Markus Naslund joined the team, and Cliff Ronning's final season with the Canucks.

Regular season

Standings

Schedule and results

Playoffs

Western Conference Quarterfinals: vs. (2) Colorado Avalanche
Colorado wins series 4–2

Player statistics

Scoring leaders

Note: GP = Games played; G = Goals; A = Assists; Pts = Points; +/- = Plus/minus; PIM = Penalty Minutes

Goaltending

Note: GP = Games played; TOI = Time on ice (minutes); W = Wins; L = Losses; T = Ties; GA = Goals against; SO = Shutouts; Sv% = Save percentage; GAA = Goals Against Average

Playoffs

Scoring leaders
Note: GP = Games played; G = Goals; A = Assists; Pts = Points; +/- = Plus/minus; PIM = Penalty Minutes

Goaltending
Note: GP = Games played; TOI = Time on ice (minutes); W = Wins; L = Losses; GA = Goals against; SO = Shutouts; Sv% = Save percentage; GAA = Goals Against Average

Awards and records

Transactions

Trades

Free agents acquired

Free agents lost

Received from waivers

Placed on waivers

Draft picks
Vancouver's picks at the 1995 NHL Entry Draft in Edmonton, Alberta.

References

Vancouver Canucks seasons
Vancouver Canucks season, 1995-96
Vancouver C